Stelis bracteosa is a species of orchid plant native to Peru.

References 

bracteosa
Flora of Peru